GLIS family zinc finger 2 also known as GLIS2 is a human gene.

Function 

The protein encoded by this gene is a Kruppel-like transcription factor which functions depending on the gene and promoter context as an activator or repressor of gene transcription. GLIS2 plays a role in kidney development and neurogenesis.

Glis2 knockout mice display decreased size and weight.  The kidneys in these mice show progressive kidney atrophy and display symptoms similar to human nephronophthisis. Glis2 plays an essential role in the maintenance of renal tissue through prevention of apoptosis and fibrosis.

Clinical significance 

Mutations in the GLIS2 gene are associated with nephronophthisis.

References